Top of the Box is a British television series created by BBC Studios for Channel 5, who have re-titled the series under names such as Greatest TV Moments of the 1980s, Greatest TV Moments of the 1990s and TV Gold since is original transmission.

Presented by Matthew Kelly, each episode counts down the Top 20 most viewed TV shows in the UK during a particular year – the series was billed as the "TV time machine". The programme ran for a single series of four episodes. The first episode, "1985", was broadcast on Channel 5 at 9 p.m. on 20 May 2018, while the final three episodes were broadcast at 10 p.m. the following Sundays. As well as the countdown, each episode featured punditry from guests such as Lionel Blair and Maggie Moone, and correspondence from stars of the time (such as Janet Ellis and Rustie Lee), who discussed either the comedy, entertainment, soap or children's TV shows of that year.

The first episode of Top of the Box, "1985", was noted for featuring the final interview with comedian and Bullseye host Jim Bowen, who died a few weeks after filming, whilst the "1989" episode features interviews with Wayne Dobson, Les Dennis and Barry Cryer.

Episodes

References

External links

2010s British comedy television series
2010s British documentary television series
2018 British television series debuts
2018 British television series endings
Channel 5 (British TV channel) original programming
English-language television shows
Television series by BBC Studios